Lê Bật Hiếu (born 22 August 1984) is a Vietnamese footballer who plays as a centre-back for V-League club Thanh Hóa. He was called up to Vietnam national football team in 2012.

References 

1984 births
Living people
Vietnamese footballers
Association football central defenders
V.League 1 players
Haiphong FC players
Than Quang Ninh FC players
Thanh Hóa FC players
Vietnam international footballers
People from Thanh Hóa province